Laurent Recouderc was the defending champion, but he lost to Bastian Knittel in the second round.
Rubén Ramírez Hidalgo won in the final 6–4, 6–4, against her compatriot Marcel Granollers.

Seeds

Draw

Finals

Top half

Bottom half

External links
 Main draw
 Qualifying draw

2010 Singles
Rabat,Singles